Marthin Alessandro Dusay (born 16 February 1999), commonly known as Alex Dusay is an Indonesian professional footballer who plays as a centre-back for Liga 2 club Persipura Jayapura.

Club career

Persewar Waropen
In 2021, Dusay signed a contract with Indonesian Liga 2 club Persewar Waropen. He made his league debut on 10 November 2021 in a match against Kalteng Putra at the Batakan Stadium, Balikpapan.

PSS Sleman
He was signed for PSS Sleman to play in Liga 1 in the 2021 season. Dusay made his league debut on 2 January 2022 in a match against Persik Kediri at the Kapten I Wayan Dipta Stadium, Gianyar.

Career statistics

Club

References

External links
 Alex Dusay at Soccerway
 Alex Dusay at Liga Indonesia

1999 births
Living people
Indonesian footballers
PSS Sleman players
Association football defenders
People from Jayapura
Sportspeople from Papua